Manaung is a township of Kyaukpyu District in the Rakhine State of Western Myanmar. The principal town is Manaung. Manaung Township, situated on Manaung Island, consists of three islands: Manaung Island, Ye Kyun Island and Taik Kyun Island. Manaung is not only a township of Kyaukpyu District but also the second biggest island of Rakhine State in Myanmar.

The Bay of Bengal is located to the West and Northwest, Ramree Island in the Northeast, Ye Kyun Island in the South and Taungup in the East. Manaung Island, about 55 miles in circumference, is situated at 18'47 (898'N) and 93'98 (472'E) on the Rakhine Coast of Myanmar.

The highest mountain is 972 feet (296 m) high and the lowest level is 6 feet (1.8 m) above sea level. The population was 95927 on October 31, 2007.

There are 5 wards and 138 villages in Manaung Township.

There is one township stadium.

Education
There are 7 high schools, 11 middle schools and 106 elementary schools. There is one nursery school. There are 127 libraries.

List of Township Administrators
U Tin Than		18-9-1988 to 19-11-1991
U Mya Than		19-11-1991 to 7-11-1992
U Maung Than		7-11-1992 to 12-8-1993
U Oo tun Aung		12-8-1993 to 3-7-1998
U Han Soe		3-7-1998 to 15-9-1998
U Sai Maung Nyi		15-9-1998 to 14-1-1999
U Pot (aka) Thar Moe	14-1-1999 to 7-11-2001
U Tun San Win		7-11-2001 to 25-7-2002
U Hla Thein		19-9-2001 to 9-12-2004
U Naing Tun		9-12-2004 to 16-8-2007
U Nyi Nyi Lwin		16-8-2007 to present

See also
Manaung Township Association (Yangon)

Townships of Rakhine State